Ludwig Ott (24 October 1906 in Neumarkt-St. Helena – 25 October 1985 in Eichstätt) was a Roman Catholic theologian and medievalist from Bavaria, Germany.

After training at the Catholic University of Eichstätt-Ingolstadt, Ott was ordained a priest in 1930. He received his doctorate in Munich (1931-1936) under Martin Grabmann and was mentored by him in studying the development of medieval theology. From 1960 to 1962 he was the rector of this Catholic university.

His research centered mostly in the area of dogmatics. With his Fundamentals of Catholic Dogma he produced a standard reference work on dogmatics. The work, popular with both clergy and laity, has been translated into more than ten languages. The "Foreword to the Second English Edition" (p. vii) says, "This second English edition embodies the many changes made in the second and third German editions."

Works
 Ott, Ludwig. Fundamentals of Catholic Dogma. 1955. Ed. James Bastible. Trans. Patrick Lynch. 2nd ed. St. Louis: B. Herder, 1957. Rpt. Rockford, IL: TAN Books, 1974 (most recently, 2009). Rpt. Fort Collins, CO: Roman Catholic Books, 2012 (hardback). (German: Grundriß der Katholischen Dogmatik. Freiburg: Herder, 1952.) (1952 original: .)

References

External links
 Biography of Ludwig Ott (German; archived)

1906 births
1985 deaths
20th-century German Catholic theologians
20th-century German historians
German male non-fiction writers
German medievalists
Roman Catholic theologians
Roman Catholic writers